Thersiteidae is an extinct family of fossil sea snails, marine gastropod molluscs in the superfamily Stromboidea, the true conchs and their allies.

References 

 The Taxonomicon

Prehistoric gastropods
Stromboidea